The Xiaomi Mi 5c is a smartphone developed by Xiaomi Inc. It is part of Xiaomi's high-end smartphone line, and was released in March 2017. It was the first smartphone to launch with Surge S1, Xiaomi's first SoC chipset and its bid to reduce its reliance on industry suppliers like Qualcomm.

References

External links
 Xiaomi Website

Mi 5c
Mobile phones introduced in 2017
Discontinued smartphones
Mobile phones with infrared transmitter